Piernas de Seda is a 1935 American comedy film directed by John Boland. It stars Rosita Moreno, Raul Roulien, and Enrique de Rosas. Rita Hayworth had a small uncredited role as a dancer.

References

External links
Piernas de seda at the Internet Movie Database

1935 films
American comedy films
1935 comedy films
Films directed by John Boland
American black-and-white films
Spanish-language American films
1930s Spanish-language films
1930s American films